The following lists events that happened during 1921 in Australia.

Incumbents

Monarch – George V
Governor-General – Henry Forster
Prime Minister –  Billy Hughes
Chief Justice – Adrian Knox

State premiers
Premier of New South Wales – John Storey (until 5 October), then James Dooley (from 10 October until 20 December), then George Fuller (for 7 hours on 20 December), then James Dooley
Premier of Queensland – Ted Theodore
Premier of South Australia – Henry Barwell
Premier of Tasmania – Walter Lee
Premier of Victoria – Harry Lawson
Premier of Western Australia – James Mitchell

State governors
Governor of New South Wales – Sir Walter Davidson
Governor of Queensland – Sir Matthew Nathan
Governor of South Australia – Sir William Weigall
Governor of Tasmania – Sir William Allardyce
Governor of Victoria – George Rous, 3rd Earl of Stradbroke (from 21 February)
Governor of Western Australia – Sir Francis Newdegate

Events
March – Group Settlement Scheme begins at Manjimup, Western Australia.
7 March – The Commonwealth Department of Health is formed.
12 March – Edith Cowan becomes the first female parliamentarian in Australia, when she is elected to the Western Australian Legislative Council.
22 March – New South Wales MP Percy Brookfield is shot and killed when he tackles a crazed gunman at the train station in Riverton, South Australia.
31 March – The Royal Australian Air Force is established.
9 May – Australia assumes responsibility for administration of the Territory of New Guinea, following a League of Nations mandate divesting Germany of its colonies as required by the Treaty of Versailles.
30 August – A general election is held in Victoria. Harry Lawson of the Nationalist Party is returned as premier, although in a minority government.
26 October – The first group of Barnardo's Boys arrived in Sydney.
3 November – Federal MP Walter Marks told the House of Representatives that Armageddon would occur in 1934.
13 November – The cartoon character Ginger Meggs makes his first appearance, in a Sunday Sun comic strip "Us Fellers" drawn by cartoonist Jimmy Bancks.
30 December – Twelve-year-old Alma Tirtschke is raped and murdered in Melbourne, in what becomes known as the Gun Alley Murder.
31 December – Walter Burley Griffin is removed as director of construction for Canberra after disagreements over his supervisory role.

Arts and literature

 William McInnes wins the inaugural Archibald Prize for portraiture
 Droving into the light – Hans Heysen
 Weighing the fleece – George W Lambert
 The White Glove – George W Lambert

Film
The first silent film

Sport
 Sister Olive wins the Melbourne Cup
 New South Wales wins the Sheffield Shield
 In Test Cricket, Australia defeated England in The Ashes series
 A Le Fevre wins the Australian Open Championship in golf
 The 1921 VFL seasonThe Premiership is won by Richmond 5.6.36 to Carlton 4.8.32. Attendance 43,122 at the MCG. 
 The 1921 NSWRFL season sees the introduction of the St. George club, replacing Annandale, who departed the league after the 1920 season. The Premiership is won by North Sydney.

Births
3 January 
Bob Dawson, Australian rules footballer 
Vasey Houghton, politician and conservationist (died 2001)
9 January – Bunney Brooke, actor (Number 96) (died 2000)
3 February – John Millett, poet (died 2019)
16 February – Bill Knott, NSW politician (died 2013)
21 February – Rupert Myers, metallurgist (died 2019) 
4 March – Walter Campbell, Governor of Queensland (died 2004)
12 March – Norm Foster, politician (died 2006)
28 April – Robert Furlonger, diplomat and public servant (died 2019)
29 March – Sam Loxton, cricketer (died 2011)
1 April – Harold James Frith, ornithologist (died 1982)
13 April – Max Harris, writer (Angry Penguins) (died 1995)
13 May – George Petersen, Labor politician (died 2000)
26 May – Norman Hetherington, artist, puppeteer (died 2010)
28 May – Tom Uren, Labor politician (died 2015)
3 June – Forbes Carlile, swimming coach and Olympic pentathlete (died 2016)
7 June – Myrtle Edwards, cricketer and softball player (died 2010)
19 June – Patricia Wrightson, children's author (died 2010)
1 July – Teddy Long, Australian rules footballer (died 2008) 
15 July – Barrie Dexter, senior diplomat (died 2018)
21 July – Mary MacLean Hindmarsh, botanist (died 2000)
22 July – Ronald N. Bracewell, physicist and radio astronomer (died 2007)
31 July – John Makepeace Bennett, computer scientist (died 2010)
9 August – Catherine Pym, fencer (died 2018)
20 August – Jack Wilson, cricketer (died 1985)
21 November – Betty Wilson, cricketer (died 2010)
24 November – Allan Ashbolt, journalist (died 2005)
26 December – Donald Horne, journalist and writer (died 2005)

Deaths

 14 January – Edward Hamersley, Western Australian politician and pastoralist (born in France) (b. 1835)
 27 January – Maurice Buckley, soldier (b. 1891)
 26 February – William Emmett Murphy, trade unionist (born in Ireland) (b. 1841)
 14 March – Gustave Barnes, artist (born in the United Kingdom) (b. 1877)
 21 May – Oswald Watt, aviator and businessman (born in the United Kingdom) (b. 1878)
 3 June – Jim Page, Queensland politician (born in the United Kingdom) (b. 1861)
 6 June – William Mark Forster, philanthropist (born in the United Kingdom) (b. 1846)
 18 June – G. H. Gibson, writer and satirist (born in the United Kingdom) (b. 1846)
 2 July – Edwin Evans, cricketer (b. 1849)
 12 July – Harry Hawker, aviation pioneer (died in the United Kingdom) (b. 1889)
 26 July – Howard Vernon, actor (b. 1845)
 1 August – T. J. Ryan, 19th Premier of Queensland (b. 1876)
 7 August – Rose Ann Creal, military nurse, recipient of Royal Red Cross medal (b. 1865)
 23 August – Frank Hann, pastoralist and explorer (born in the United Kingdom) (b. 1845)
 13 September – James Hebblethwaite, poet (born in the United Kingdom) (b. 1857)
 5 October – John Storey, 20th Premier of New South Wales (b. 1869)
 30 October – James Murdoch, Orientalist scholar and journalist (born in the United Kingdom) (b. 1856)
 6 November – Robert Logan Jack, geologist (born in the United Kingdom) (b. 1845)
 17 November – John McLaren, cricketer (b. 1886)
 27 November - Mary Grant Roberts, zoo owner (b. 1841)
 24 December – William Curran, cricketer (b. 1862)

See also
 List of Australian films of the 1920s

References

 
Australia
Years of the 20th century in Australia